is a Japanese actress, singer and model. She was one of the original three members of the J-Pop group "Dream". She debuted as a gravure idol in 2004. She has also starred in a number of Japanese movies and TV dramas. She was formerly a member of a unit called Kingyo with Nao Nagasawa and Aiko Kayō.

Filmography

Movies 
 Chikan Otoko (2005)
 Love Psycho (2006)
 Mayonaka no Shōjotachi (2006)
 Backdancers!  (2006)

TV 
 Mahora no Hoshi (2005)
 Karera no Umi VII: Wish on the Polestar (2005)
 Girl's Box (2005)
 Koi Suru!? Kyaba Jō (2006)

Discography

Shared singles 
 Keitai Aika Sonogo / Gōkon Aika Sonogo (携帯哀歌 その後/合コン哀歌 その後) (with Tokyo Purin) (11 January 2006)

Various artists' albums 
 Girl's Box: Best Hits Compilation (16 March 2005)
 Girl's Box: Best Hits Compilation Winter (30 November 2005)
 Backdancers! Original Soundtrack (23 August 2006)

Other releases

DVD 
 Natural (28 January 2005)
 Move in I Love Yu (23 September 2005)
 Dramatic Space (27 April 2007)

Photobooks 
 Yu & I (16 March 2005)
 I Love Yu (31 July 2005)
 Talk to... Twelve Flowers (15 December 2006)

References

External links
 Blog 

1986 births
Living people
Dream (Japanese group)
Japanese female models
Japanese gravure idols
Japanese gravure models
Japanese-language singers
Japanese women pop singers
Musicians from Gifu Prefecture
People from Gifu
Actresses from Gifu Prefecture
21st-century Japanese singers
Models from Gifu Prefecture
LDH (company) artists
21st-century Japanese women singers